Whitney Brook is a stream in Mille Lacs County, in the U.S. state of Minnesota.

Whitney Brook bears the name of a local lumberman.

See also
List of rivers of Minnesota

References

Rivers of Mille Lacs County, Minnesota
Rivers of Minnesota